George Ashman (29 August 1879 – 2 September 1947) was an Australian rules footballer who played with Collingwood in the Victorian Football League (VFL).

Notes

External links 

		
George Ashman's profile at Collingwood Forever

1879 births
1947 deaths
Australian rules footballers from Melbourne
Collingwood Football Club players
People from Collingwood, Victoria